Ulrike Fitzer (née Flender, born 1982 in Aidlingen) is a female German Air Force pilot.

Life 
Ulrike Fitzer was the first female fighter pilot in the German Air Force. She graduated in 2006, from the Euro-NATO Joint Jet Pilot Training Program at Sheppard Air Force Base. Also, she is the first German female Tornado pilot, having completed training in 2007 at Holloman Air Force Base. A TV-documentary (Mission am Limit) on her achievements was produced in 2007.

References 
Sheppard Air Force Base News, 9/22/2006

1982 births
Living people
German Air Force pilots
German women aviators
20th-century German women
21st-century German women
Military personnel from Baden-Württemberg